Nacimiento-Fergusson Road is the only road across the Santa Lucia Range on the Central Coast of California, connecting California State Route 1 and the Big Sur coast to U.S. Route 101 and the Salinas Valley. The road is well-paved and maintained over its length, but is winding and has precipitous drops. It is widely regarded as one of the best motorcycling roads in central California due to its ocean views and forest setting.

In January 2021, the road was washed out due to the impacts of the Dolan Fire and closed. It did not  reopen until early 2022.

In January 2023, the road was badly damaged by heavy rains during the  winter storms. Extensive slides, debris flows and road failures at a dozen sites along the road rendered the road impassable to vehicle traffic. The road will remain closed under a Forest Order until repairs can be made. The public is strongly encouraged to avoid Nacimiento-Fergusson Road until the road has been cleared of debris and is safe for through traffic. Initial cost estimates for fixing the road run into the millions of dollars.

History 

During the late 19th century, settlers on the coast of the northern Santa Lucia Mountains had a difficult time transporting cattle to the Central Valley over poor mountain trails. The only trail across the mountains was the route currently followed by the Nacimiento-Fergusson Road. The trail was enlarged into a road beginning in 1931, and completed in 1937. The road was constructed by crews composed of men from the Civilian Conservation Corp, U.S. Forest Service, and state and county relief agencies.

Route description 

Nacimiento-Fergusson Road connects California State Route 1 at the south end of the Kirk Creek Bridge with Jolon    to the east. It is the only route across the Santa Lucia Mountains between Monterey and Cambria  in northern San Luis Obispo County where California State Route 46 connects California State Route 1 to U.S. Route 101 in Paso Robles at the southern end of the Salinas Valley.

From the summit, the road descends through hillside chaparral and dense oak groves on the eastern side of the ridge, which offer few views, and passes through the U.S. Army's Fort Hunter Liggett. Because the road passes through sections of Fort Hunter Liggett Army Base, you may need to show valid car registration and proof of insurance. The road is steep, winding, sometimes only wide enough for one vehicle, and has precipitous drops at almost every turn unprotected by guard rails.

At the eastern end, drivers can access the road via either from the north on Jolon Road on U.S. Route 101 near King City, or from the south on Jolon Road at U.S. Route 101 near Bradley. The road is closed occasionally during tank, artillery, and other firing exercises on the surrounding Fort Hunter Liggett.

Campgrounds 
The Nacimiento and Ponderosa Campgrounds are situated on the eastern slope of the Santa Lucia range within Los Padres National Forest. The Nacimiento Campground, nestled beneath Douglas fir trees alongside the Nacimiento River, is adjacent to Nacimiento-Fergusson Road and provides less privacy. Ponderosa Campground, known on some maps as "Camp Nacimiento", provides a private setting within a valley off the main road along the Negro Fork of the Nacimiento River.

Due to the history of wildfires in the area, campfires are only permitted in established campgrounds. It is illegal to camp in other locations, such as road side pullouts. Illegal camping or campfires can result in a $5,000 fine.

References 

Roads in Monterey County, California
Monterey Ranger District, Los Padres National Forest
Big Sur